Valió la Pena (lit: It was worth it), also known as  My Little Dilemma is a Chilean television soap opera, that aired on Canal 13 from October 19, 2014, to February 19, 2015, starring Lorena Bosch, Francisco Pérez-Bannen and Cristián Arriagada.

Cast

Main characters 
 Lorena Bosch as Rosario García.
 Cristián Arriagada as Gastón Rodríguez.
 Francisco Pérez-Bannen as Sergio Valenzuela / Rodrigo Infante.
 María Fernanda Martínez as Ema Valenzuela.
 Josefina Montané as Antonia Riquelme.
 Mónica Godoy as Martina del Río.

Supporting characters 
 Bastián Bodenhöfer as Raimundo Montes.
 Liliana García as Fernanda Vicuña.
 Josefina Velasco as Lidia Fernández.
 Julio Jung as Lorenzo García.
 María José Bello as Verónica García.
 Marcela del Valle as Magdalena Tagle.
 Catalina González as Miss Pamela Riquelme.
 Cristóbal Tapia-Montt as Felipe Montes.
 Claudio Arredondo as Juan Roca (alias Johnny Rock).
 Ingrid Parra as Karem Jara.
 Eduardo Cumar as Arturo Santa Cruz.
 Cristóbal del Real as Juan Pablo Gómez.
 Francisco Dañobeitia as Vicente Rodríguez.
 Emilia Sánchez as Bélen Santa Cruz.
 Benjamín Ruíz as Mateo Gómez.
 Francisco Godoy as Diego Rodríguez.
 Oliver Borner as Cristóbal Jara "Mamito" / Cristóbal Contreras Jara.

Guest appearances 
 Javiera Hernández as Loreto Zúñiga
 Mario Bustos as Mauro Quispe / Carlos Cacéres
 Ándres San Juan as Moncho
 Antonella Ríos as Sonia
 Edgardo Bruna as Raúl García
 Juan Pablo Bastidas as MD Sebastian Díaz
 Francisco González as Capatáz Pedro
 Francisca Opazo as NTPC Show panellist
 Paola Giannini as Daniela
 Sebastian de la Cuesta as Rafael Lawyer
 Agustín Moya as Ismael Rodríguez
 María José Necochea as Francesca
 Gabriel Sepulveda as Renzo
 Francisca Reiss as Regina
 Marcial Edwards as Rosamel
 Maite Neira as Isidora
 Camila Hirane as María de los Ángeles Palma / Yazmín
 Sandra O'Ryan as María José
 Gabriel Martina as Aléx
 Yuyuníz Navas as Yoga Teacher
 Paola Lértora as Judge
 Karla Matta as NTPC Show Reporter
 Ariel Cerda as Charlie Contreras / Bianca del Río
 Patricia Lopéz Ríos as Hotel owner
 Mireya Sotoconil as former employee of family Santa Crúz
 Nicolás Massú as himself
 Nicole "Luli" Moreno as himself
 Sergio Lagos as himself
 Francisco Saavedra as himself

Reception

Television ratings

International broadcast 
 Ecuador: Telerama (2016).

References

External links 
 

2014 telenovelas
2014 Chilean television series debuts
2015 Chilean television series endings
Chilean telenovelas
Spanish-language telenovelas
Canal 13 (Chilean TV channel) telenovelas
Television shows set in Santiago